The Butterfly Ball and the Grasshopper's Feast is a concept album and subsequent live rock opera appearing in 1974 and 1975 respectively, based on the children's poem of a similar title. The album cover design is from Alan Aldridge's design for a 1973 book based on the poem.

Origin and production history 
The work was originally conceived as a solo vehicle for Jon Lord to be produced by Roger Glover who had recently left Deep Purple. However, Lord proved too busy with Deep Purple, and Glover took up the reins on his own. Using his connections, Glover recruited a large cast of noted rock musicians, with a different vocalist for each character, including David Coverdale and Glenn Hughes.

An accompanying animated short film, The Butterfly Ball, was made by the Halas & Batchelor company.

On 16 October 1975, a one-off performance at the Royal Albert Hall took place. Again it had a star-studded cast of rock musicians, most notably Ian Gillan who was drafted in at the last minute and received a standing ovation on his entrance.  He replaced an unavailable Ronnie James Dio who had commitments with Ritchie Blackmore's Rainbow (although Dio did eventually get to perform the song at the Royal Albert Hall in 1999 as the guest of Deep Purple). Gillan had not performed since leaving Deep Purple in 1973. Also notable was the appearance of Twiggy as singer and actress and Vincent Price as narrator. Apart from most of the musicians involved in the studio recording, the concert also featured Jon Lord. The live concert was filmed and released in 1976, produced by Tony Klinger.

Later appearance 
Colin Meloy of The Decemberists has used the piece as intro music for the band's shows.

Track listing

Charts

Personnel (original album) 
 Jack Emblow - accordion
 Ray Fenwick - guitar
 Mike Moran, Ann Odell - piano
 Roger Glover - synthesiser, piano, guitar, bass guitar, percussion, backing vocals
 Eddie Hardin - piano, organ, synthesizer, backing vocals
 Eddie Jobson - violin
 Chris Karan - tabla
 Robin Thompson - bassoon
 Nigel Watson - saw
 Mo Foster - bass guitar, double bass, finger pops
 Les Binks - drums
 Mike Giles - drums
 Joanne Williams - backing vocals
 Kay Garner - backing vocals
 Judi Kuhl - backing vocals
 Barry St. John - backing vocals
 Helen Chappelle - backing vocals
 The Mountain Fjord Orchestra led by David Woodcock and conducted by Martin Ford, John Bell and Del Newman.
 Alan Aldridge, Harry Wilcock - cover design
 George Peckham - mastering

References

External links 
 Roger Glover & Guests - The Butterfly Ball And the Grasshopper's Feast, AvxHome.se. Dave Thompson is credited with some or all of the text at this website. The unsourced "Origin and production history" body of this Wikipedia article (as of April 2011) appears to be sourced from—or to be commonly sourced with—this text.
 
 The Butterfly Ball And The Grasshopper's Feast at Discogs.com

1974 debut albums
Concept albums
Albums produced by Roger Glover
Roger Glover albums
Purple Records albums
UK Records albums
Albums with cover art by Alan Aldridge
Rock operas